DMCA's Sky (originally released as No Mario's Sky) is a 2016 open world platform game developed by ASMB Games for Microsoft Windows, OS X, and Linux. As No Mario's Sky, it was a fangame of both Super Mario Bros. and No Man's Sky.

Gameplay 
DMCA's Sky combines gameplay elements of side-scrolling platform games like Super Mario Bros. and open world space exploration games like No Man's Sky. The player controls an astronaut named Finn who uses a futuristic spacecraft to travel between procedurally generated planets. Gameplay primarily takes place on these planets, where Finn can run, jump, and find collectibles in a similar fashion to the Super Mario series.

Development
In August 2016, soon after the release of No Man's Sky, No Mario's Sky was created by ASMB Games, a team based in Australia, for Ludum Dare 36 in 72 hours. The team consisted of Alex McDonald (art and sound director), Sam Izzo, Max Cahill, and Ben Porter.

DMCA removal and re-release 
Nintendo sent a Digital Millennium Copyright Act (DMCA) notice to Itch.io on 4 September 2016, requesting that No Mario's Sky be removed due to it infringing "Nintendo's copyrights in its Super Mario video game franchise, including but not limited to the audiovisual work, images, and fictional character depictions". In response, the official page for No Mario's Sky was updated to indicate that the game was no longer available, and the downloads for the game were replaced with a link to the DMCA notice.

On 5 September 2016, the game was re-released as DMCA's Sky, with all in-game elements and terms that directly referenced Super Mario replaced with non-copyrighted counterparts.

Deep Sky 
ASMB Games released a prototype called Deep Sky as a spiritual successor to the game, later stating that further development had been stalled due to lack of funding.

References

External links
 

2016 video games
Fangames
Games about extraterrestrial life
Linux games
MacOS games
Open-world video games
Parody video games
Platform games
Science fiction video games
Video games developed in Australia
Video games set on fictional planets
Video games using procedural generation
Windows games
Unauthorized video games
Unofficial works based on Mario